Owlang-e Amanabad (also Romanized as Owlang-e Amānābād; also known as Owlang) is a village in Sarjam Rural District, Ahmadabad District, Mashhad County, Razavi Khorasan Province, Iran. At the 2006 census, its population was 707, in 192 families.

References 

Populated places in Mashhad County